Christian Girard (born 7 May 1952) is a French politician who has represented the 1st constituency of the Alpes-de-Haute-Provence department in the National Assembly since 2022. A member of the National Rally (RN), he has also held a seat in the Regional Council of Provence-Alpes-Côte d'Azur since 2021. In Parliament, Girard sits on the National Defence and Armed Forces Committee.

In 2021, Girard, the departmental party leader, unsuccessfully ran for the Departmental Council of Alpes-de-Haute-Provence under the National Rally banner in the canton of Manosque-1.

See also 
 List of deputies of the 16th National Assembly of France

References 

Living people
1952 births
Deputies of the 16th National Assembly of the French Fifth Republic
National Rally (France) politicians
21st-century French politicians
People from Manosque
Members of the Regional Council of Provence-Alpes-Côte d'Azur